Sacred fire or holy fire may refer to:


Religion
Any instance of fire worship
Fire personified in Indo-European religion:
Atar in Zoroastrianism
Agni in historical Vedic religion and Hinduism
The Sacred fire of Vesta in ancient Roman religion
Holy Fire, a concept in Orthodox Christianity
The sacred fire in Solomon's Temple
The sacramental Easter Fire

Entertainment

Books
Sacred Fire (novel), a 2003 Dragonlance novel by Chris Pierson
Holy Fire (novel), a 1996 novel by Bruce Sterling

Music
Sacred Fire, a 2011 album by Jimmy Cliff
Sacred Fire: Live in South America, a 1993 album by Santana
Holy Fire (album), an album by Foals released in 2013
The Holy Fire, an American indie rock band
The Holy Fire (EP), an EP by the eponymous band released in 2004

Other uses
Various diseases all also referred to as St. Anthony's fire
 Holy Fire (2018), a wildfire in California

See also
Eternal flame (disambiguation)